Nanumea Airfield is a former World War II airfield on the island of Nanumea in the Ellice Islands (now known as Tuvalu).

History

World War II
Nanumea Airfield was built by United States Navy Seabees during the Pacific War as an alternative strip to Nukufetau and Funafuti airfields to allow for further dispersal of aircraft in the Ellice Islands (now Tuvalu).

On 7 September 1943 ten Betty bombers of the 755th Kōkūtai (air group) from Tarawa Atoll, Gilbert Islands, drop 20 bombs on Nanumea. The next day Betty bombers again bombed Nanumea.

On 19 September F4F-4s of VMF-441 landed on the strip and continued to use the runway during the remainder of the construction period. The first bombers landed on 12 November. The Seabees also built the camp and operation facilities for the airfield, including an 8,000-barrel tank farm for aviation gasoline.

United States Army Air Forces (USAAF) units based at Nanumea included:
30th Bombardment Group headquarters from 11 November 1943 – 4 January 1944
27th Bombardment Squadron operating B-24s from 10 November 1943 – 26 February 1944
28th Bombardment Squadron operating B-24s from 12 November 1943 – 13 March 1944
45th Fighter Squadron operating P-40Ns from 28 November 1943 – 4 January 1944

United States Marine Corps (USMC) units based at Nanumea included:
 Marine Fighting Squadron 441 (VMF-441), flying the F4F Wildcat, operated from Nanumea from 28 September – December 1943.
 Marine Attack Squadron 331 (VMA-331) flew Douglas SBD Dauntless dive bombers from Nanumea from 15 November 1943.

On 11 November 1943 a Japanese air raid on Nanumea resulted in the destruction of one B-24.

On 19 November 1943 B-24 No. 42~72980 of the 27th Bombardment Squadron crashed on landing.

On 27 November 1943 SBD No. 38035 of VMA-331 crashed due to undercarriage failure.

By September 1944 base roll-up and salvage operations had commenced and were completed by the end of March 1945.
Wreckage of the aircraft remained on the island.

Postwar
After the Pacific War the airfield was dismantled and the land returned to its owners, however as the coral base was compacted to make the runway the land now provides poor ground for growing coconuts.

See also
 USAAF in the Central Pacific
Funafuti Airfield
Nukufetau Airfield

References

Defunct airports
Airfields in the Pacific theatre of World War II
Airfields of the United States Navy
Airfields of the United States Army Air Forces in the Pacific Ocean theatre of World War II
History of Tuvalu
Military installations closed in the 1940s
1943 establishments in Oceania
1945 disestablishments in Oceania
Closed installations of the United States Navy 
Closed installations of the United States Army